Georgios Kalafatis (ca. 1652 – ca. 9 February 1720) was a Greek professor of theoretical and practical medicine who was largely active in Padua and Venice in the 17th-century Italian Renaissance.

Biography 

Georgios Kalafatis was born on the island of Crete in 1652, in the city of Chania (Canea). His father Stefanos Kalafatis belonged to a wealthy local Greek family which was descended from the imperial Byzantine family. Early in his career Georgios studied medicine eventually moving to Italy to further his education. Entering the University of Padua in 1679 he became professor of practical and theoretical medicine at the age of just 29. In 1682 Kalafatis moved to Venice where he wrote Trattato sopra la peste, whilst there he met and married Alba Caterina Muazzo, a Venetian noblewoman. In 1692 he became a member of the Galileiana Academy of Arts and Science in Padua. He died on February 9, 1720, in Padua and was buried along with his wife in the Basilica.

See also
Greek scholars in the Renaissance

Sources and references

1650s births
1720 deaths
People from Chania
Scholars from Crete
Kingdom of Candia
Greek Renaissance humanists
17th-century Greek physicians
18th-century Greek physicians
Academic staff of the University of Padua
18th-century Greek scientists
18th-century Greek educators